Hashiuchi (written: 橋内) is a Japanese surname. Notable people with the surname include:

, Japanese footballer
, Japanese footballer

Japanese-language surnames